Banna Bannada Loka (Glittering world) is a 2011 Indian Kannada-language romance film written and directed by Ram Prasad. The film will star Ram Prasad and Shravani  along with Rangayana Raghu and Rekha. The story of the film revolves around  a youngster from a Mangalore-based Kannada family. The happy-go-lucky man's life undergoes a sudden turn. The decisions he takes after that is the rest of the story. The film is produced by Krishnappa and features background score and soundtrack composed by Thomas Rathnam  with cinematography handled by  Chandra Sekar. The film, which commenced production in 2009 and released on 2011.

Cast
 Ram Prasad
 Meghna 
 Shravani 
 Arpana Prabhu 
 Rangayana Raghu

Production

Filming
Filmed in and around Bangalore, Mysore, Mangalore and Andaman.

Soundtrack

Thomas Rathnam  composed the soundtrack, teaming up with Ram Prasad for the first time. The soundtrack album consists of seven tracks. The lyrics were written by  Kavi Kempagiri, Suresh Keerthi, Ram Prasad and Ubasya.
Reports stating that S. P. Balasubrahmanyam sang one song, which is the greatest lifetime hit. "E Loka" a song about the pathetic life style of the cine field people. Ultimately a fast song "Kanasina Marata" sung by Gurukiran  is the optimistic song for the youth, who wish to achieve some thing in their life.

Reception

Critical response 

B S Srivani from Deccan Herald wrote "The surprise package is Moggina Manasu Harsha, who is wasted. It is evident the team doesn't have a clue about anything. Neither Chandrashekhar nor T A Thomas have much to do. Every year during Holi time, people are warned about the harmful effects of colours. Alas, that holds true here as well!". A critic from News18 India wrote "The two heroines - Meghana Gowda and Shravani - do not make any impact. Even a good actress like Rekha Kumar fails to do justice to her role. Watching "Banna Bannada Loka" is sheer torture".

References

2011 films
2010s Kannada-language films